Trenholm Point is an ice-covered point 8 nautical miles (15 km) northwest of Eldred Point on the coast of Marie Byrd Land. It marks the northern end of the peninsula between Holcomb Glacier and El-Sayed Glacier. Mapped by United States Geological Survey (USGS) from surveys and U.S. Navy aerial photography, 1959–65. Named by Advisory Committee on Antarctic Names (US-ACAN) for William L. Trenholm, glaciologist at Byrd Station in three summer seasons, 1967–70.

References

Headlands of Marie Byrd Land